Fernando González was the defending champion, but did not compete this year.

Argentine Guillermo Coria won the tournament without dropping a set, defeating compatriot David Nalbandian in the final, 6–4, 6–3.

Draw

Finals

Top half

Section 1

Section 2

Bottom half

Section 3

Section 4

References
Main Draw

Boys' Singles
1999